The Mitchell–Netravali filters or BC-splines are a group of reconstruction filters used primarily in computer graphics, which can be used, for example, for anti-aliasing or for scaling raster graphics. They are also known as bicubic filters in image editing programs because they are bi-dimensional cubic splines.

Definition 

The Mitchell–Netravali filters were designed as part of an investigation into artifacts from reconstruction filters. The filters are piece-wise cubic filters with four-pixel wide supports. The filters are defined as follows:

It is possible to construct two-dimensional versions of the Mitchell–Netravali filters by separation. In this case the filters can be replaced by a series of interpolations with the one-dimensional filter.

Subjective effects 

Various artifacts may result from certain choices of parameters B and C, as shown in the following illustration. The researchers recommended values from the family  (dashed line) and especially  as a satisfactory compromise.

Implementations 

The following parameters result in well-known cubic splines used in common image editing programs:

Examples

See also 

 Ringing artifacts
 Anisotropic filtering
 Kernel (image processing)

References 

Digital_signal_processing